The People's Literature Publishing House is a large-scale publishing house in China. It is known for scholarly publications, editions of classical Chinese literature, dictionaries, and high-quality paperbacks. Its head office is at Chaoyangmen 116, Beijing. Its current director is Pan Kaixiong and the editor-in-chief is Guan Shiguang.

Leaders
 Director: Pan Kaixiong
 Deputy director: Liu Guohui and Liu Xianwen
 Editor-in-chief: Guan Shiguang
 Deputy editor-in-chief: Xiao Yuanyuan and Cao Jian

See also
 Publishing industry in China

References

External links
 

Book publishing companies of China
Mass media in Beijing
Publishing companies established in the 1950s